Paul Haesaert may refer to:

 Paul Haesaert (painter) (1813–1893), Belgian painter
 Paul Haesaerts (1901–1974), Belgian artist